Dmitriyevy Gory is a rural locality (a selo) and the administrative center of Dmitriyevogorskoye Rural Settlement, Melenkovsky District, Vladimir Oblast, Russia. The population was 1,268 as of 2010. There are 9 streets.

Geography 
Dmitriyevy Gory is located on the Oka River, 24 km southeast of Melenki (the district's administrative centre) by road. Kononovo is the nearest rural locality.

References 

Rural localities in Melenkovsky District
Melenkovsky Uyezd